Roelof is a given name, the Dutch cognate of Rudolph. Notable people with the name include:

Roelof Bisschop (born 1956), Dutch historian and politician
Roelof Botha (born 1973), venture capitalist and company director
Roelof Frederik Botha or Pik Botha (1932–2018), former politician from South Africa
Johannes Roelof Maria van den Brink (1915–2006), Dutch politician and banker
Paulus Roelof Cantz'laar (1771–1831), Dutch naval officer and colonial governor
Roelof Dednam (born 1985), male badminton player from South Africa
Roelof Diodati (1658–1723), governor of Dutch Mauritius in the late 17th century
Roelof Frankot (1911–1984), Dutch painter
Roelof Hordijk (1917–1979), Dutch fencer
Roelof Huysmann (1444–1485), pre-Erasmian humanist of the northern Low Countries
Roelof Klein (1877–1960), Dutch rower who competed at the 1900 Summer Olympics in Paris
Roelof Koets (1592–1654), Dutch Golden Age painter
Roelof Koets (Zwolle) (1655–1725), 18th-century painter from the Northern Netherlands
Roelof Koops (1909–2008), Dutch speed skater who competed in the 1936 Winter Olympics
Roelof Kranenburg (1880–1956), Dutch politician, lawyer and professor of state law
Roelof Kruisinga (1922–2012), Dutch physician and politician
Roelof van Laar (born 1981), Dutch politician
Roelof van Lennep (1876–1951), Dutch male tennis player
Roelof de Man (1634–1663), Dutch colonial administrator in South Africa
Roelof van der Merwe (born 1984), South African cricketer
Roelof Nelissen (born 1931), retired Dutch politician of the defunct Catholic People's Party
Roelof Smit (born 1993), South African rugby union player
Roelof Jansz van Vries (1631–1681), Dutch Golden Age painter
Roelof Wunderink (born 1948), Dutch former racing driver

See also
Roelofs
Rolf

Dutch masculine given names